Chloroclystis flaviornata is a moth in the  family Geometridae. It is found in the Democratic Republic of the Congo (it was described from the Marungu highlands).

References

Moths described in 1937
Chloroclystis
Moths of Africa